Township 1 is one of five townships in Washington County, Nebraska, United States. The population was 3,464 at the 2000 census. A 2006 estimate placed the township's population at 3,696.

The City of Fort Calhoun lies within the Township.

See also
County government in Nebraska

References

Townships in Washington County, Nebraska
Townships in Nebraska